Delta Aquilae, Latinized from δ Aquilae, is a binary star system in the equatorial constellation of Aquila. It is drifting closer with a radial velocity of −30 km/s. The system is predicted to come to within  of the Sun in around 335,000 years.

Properties

The binary nature of this system was first reported by H. L. Alden at Yale Observatory in 1936. It is an astrometric binary where the two components orbit each other with a period of 3.422 years and an eccentricity (ovalness) of about 0.36. This is a type of binary star system where the presence of the secondary component is revealed by its gravitational perturbation of the primary. The individual components have not been resolved with a telescope.

The primary member, designated component Aa, is an aging subgiant star with a stellar classification of F0 IV, where the luminosity class of IV indicates it is in the process of exhausting the supply of hydrogen at its core and evolving into a giant star. The mass of the star is 65% greater than the Sun's and it has expanded to more than double the Sun's radius. Delta Aquilae A is a Delta Scuti variable that exhibits variations in luminosity caused by pulsations in its outer envelope. This is a lower bound on the azimuthal velocity along the star's equator.

The secondary, component Ab, is a smaller star with about 67% of the Sun's mass and an estimated 61% of the radius of the Sun. It may be a K-type star.

Naming

This star, along with η Aql and θ Aql were Al Mizān (ألميزان), the Scale-beam. According to the catalogue of stars in the Technical Memorandum 33-507 – A Reduced Star Catalog Containing 537 Named Stars, Al Mizān were the title for three stars: δ Aql as Al Mizān I, η Aql as l Mizān II and θ Aql as Al Mizān III. Being the westernmost star of the asterism, Jim Kaler has suggested the name Almizan Occidental. 

On the other hand, Antonín Bečvář includes, with no further explanation, Deneb Okab in his catalogue, meaning the tail of eagle in Arabic; however, the star is situated in the centre of the constellation, which is usually identified with the chest, while the stars ε Aql and ζ Aql have been collectively known as Deneb al Okab by Arabian medieval astronomers, which might suggest that Bečvář's assumption was a misnomer.

In the catalogue of stars in the Calendarium of Al Achsasi al Mouakket, this star was designated Djenubi Menkib al Nesr (منكب ألنسر ألخنوبي – mankib al-nasr al-janúbii), which was translated into Latin as Australior Humerus Vulturis, meaning the southern shoulder of the eagle.

This star, together with η Aql, θ Aql, ι Aql, κ Aql and λ Aql, were consist Antinous, the obsolete constellation.

References

External links 
An Atlas of the Universe: Multiple Star Orbits
 Image δ Aquilae

F-type subgiants
Astrometric binaries
Aquila (constellation)
Aquilae, Delta
BD+02 3879
Aquilae, 30
0760
182640
095501
7377
Al Mizān I